West Laurel is an unincorporated area and census-designated place (CDP) in Prince George's County, Maryland, United States. Per the 2020 census, the population was 4,428.

History
As of the 2010 U.S. Census some areas previously defined by the U.S. Census Bureau as "West Laurel" were put in a new CDP, Konterra.

Geography
West Laurel is located at  (39.108858, −76.893486).

Demographics

2020 census

Note: the US Census treats Hispanic/Latino as an ethnic category. This table excludes Latinos from the racial categories and assigns them to a separate category. Hispanics/Latinos can be of any race.

2000 Census
As of the census of 2000, there were 4,083 people, 1,436 households, and 1,203 families residing in the CDP. The racial makeup of the CDP was 84.47% White, 9.33% African American, 3.62% Asian, 0.02% Pacific Islander, 0.81% from other races, and 1.74% from two or more races. Hispanic or Latino of any race were 3.43% of the population.

There were 1,436 households, out of which 33.9% had children under the age of 18 living with them, 73.1% were married couples living together, 7.7% had a female householder with no husband present, and 16.2% were non-families. 12.5% of all households were made up of individuals, and 5.2% had someone living alone who was 65 years of age or older. The average household size was 2.84 and the average family size was 3.08.

In the CDP, the population was spread out, with 24.3% under the age of 18, 4.9% from 18 to 24, 26.4% from 25 to 44, 30.8% from 45 to 64, and 13.5% who were 65 years of age or older. The median age was 42 years. For every 100 females, there were 97.2 males. For every 100 females age 18 and over, there were 93.5 males.

The median income for a household in the CDP was $83,663, and the median income for a family was $86,797. Males had a median income of $51,757 versus $39,000 for females. The per capita income for the CDP was $32,067. About 1.2% of families and 2.2% of the population were below the poverty line, including 0.5% of those under age 18 and 4.7% of those age 65 or over.

Education
West Laurel CDP is served by schools in the Prince George's County Public Schools.

Zoned schools serving sections of the CDP include Bond Mill Elementary School in West Laurel, Martin Luther King Middle School in Beltsville, and Laurel High School in Laurel.

References

Census-designated places in Prince George's County, Maryland
Census-designated places in Maryland